The list of sail emblems consists of sail emblems and their class description.

Other markings

External links 
Sailmarks 

 
Emblems